Alana Miller (born July 22, 1980) is a former professional squash player who represented Canada. She reached a career-high world ranking of World No. 30 in May 2009.

Miller was the Canadian National Champion for 2003, 2007 and 2008.

Miller retired after representing Canada at the 2010 Commonwealth Games, where she lost in the Round of 16 to England's Laura Massaro. She retired as the 35th-ranked women's squash player and highest-ranked Canadian woman.

Career statistics
Listed below

Professional tour titles (1)
All Results for Alana Miller in WISPA World's Tour tournament

References

External links

 
 
 
 

1980 births
Living people
Canadian female squash players
Sportspeople from Winnipeg
Squash players at the 2007 Pan American Games
Squash players at the 2010 Commonwealth Games
Pan American Games gold medalists for Canada
Pan American Games silver medalists for Canada
Pan American Games medalists in squash
Medalists at the 2007 Pan American Games
Commonwealth Games competitors for Canada
21st-century Canadian women